Ryu Jang-ha (born 1966) is a South Korean film director and screenwriter.

Career 
Born in 1966 in Seoul, South Korea, Ryu graduated from Chung-Ang University. He also graduated as the best student from the 12th Korean Academy of Film Arts. In 1998, he worked as assistant to director Hur Jin-ho's debut feature film Christmas in August. He reunited with Hur for his 2001 film One Fine Spring Day, writing the script as well as an assistant director.

Filmography

As director 
Springtime (2004)
Hello, Schoolgirl (2008)
Pension: Dangerous Encounter (2018)

As assistant director 
Christmas in August (1998)
One Fine Spring Day (2001)

As screenwriter 
One Fine Spring Day (2001)
Springtime (2004)
Hello, Schoolgirl (2008)

Awards 
2004 Tokyo International Film Festival: Asian Film Award - Special Mention (Springtime)

References

External links 
 
 

1966 births
Living people
South Korean film directors
South Korean screenwriters
Chung-Ang University alumni